Mathias Norsgaard Jørgensen (born 5 May 1997 in Silkeborg) is a Danish cyclist, who currently rides for UCI WorldTeam . His sister, Emma Norsgaard Jørgensen, is also a professional cyclist, riding for the women's .

Major results

2014
 1st Stage 1b Coupe du Président de la Ville de Grudziądz
 3rd Overall Tour de l'Abitibi
1st Stage 2
2015
 1st Stage 3 Coupe du Président de la Ville de Grudziądz
 1st Prologue Sint-Martinusprijs Kontich
 1st Stage 1 Aubel–Thimister–La Gleize
2016
 6th Slag om Norg
2017
 1st Chrono des Nations Under-23
 2nd Duo Normand (with Mikkel Bjerg)
 3rd Time trial, National Under-23 Road Championships
 8th Rund um den Finanzplatz Eschborn-Frankfurt U23
2018
 1st  Time trial, National Under-23 Road Championships
 1st Chrono des Nations Under-23
 3rd  Time trial, UCI Road World Under-23 Championships
 4th Chrono Champenois
 5th Time trial, National Road Championships
2019
 1st Duo Normand (with Rasmus Quaade)
 1st Stage 1 Tour de l'Avenir
 2nd Chrono des Nations Under-23 
 3rd Time trial, National Under-23 Road Championships
 4th Time trial, UCI Road World Under-23 Championships
 4th Time trial, National Road Championships
 5th Hafjell GP
 10th Gylne Gutuer
2021
 National Road Championships
3rd Road race
4th Time trial
2022
 1st  Time trial, National Road Championships

Grand Tour general classification results timeline

Classics results timeline

References

External links

1997 births
Living people
Danish male cyclists
People from Silkeborg
Sportspeople from the Central Denmark Region